Lindy Cameron  is a British civil servant who is chief executive officer at the National Cyber Security Centre. She was previously Director-General responsible for the Department for International Development’s programmes in Africa, Asia and the Middle East. She was awarded an Order of the Bath in the 2020 Birthday Honours for her services to international development.

Early life and education 
Cameron was born in Belfast. Her father was a founding member of the Corrymeela Community Peace and Reconciliation Centre. She completed her undergraduate studies at the University of Oxford, where she studied modern history. She graduated from Balliol College in 1991, before starting a course in international relations at Tufts University as a Fulbright scholar. After graduating, Cameron joined McKinsey & Company, where she worked as a management consultant until 1998.

Research and career 
In 1998, Cameron joined the Department for International Development (DFID). She served as head of both the DFID Country Offices in Iraq and Afghanistan. She was awarded an Order of the British Empire for her services to Iraq in 2004. Cameron was seconded to the Cabinet of the United Kingdom in 2007, where she worked on Trader and Development in Africa. She moved to the Foreign Office to lead the Helmand Provincial Reconstruction Team. After completing a year long programme at the Royal College of Defence Studies, Cameron returned to DFID in 2011, where she was appointed director of the Middle East. She spent two years in this role before being promoted to director general,  overseeing a £4 billion budget.

National Cyber Security Centre

Cameron was appointed chief executive officer of the National Cyber Security Centre in 2020, becoming the second person to hold such a position at the NCSC. She succeeded the founding CEO, Ciaran Martin. Martin was made a Companion of the Order of the Bath in the 2020 Birthday Honours for his services to cyber security and Cameron received the same honour for her services to international development.

In March 2021 during Cameron's inaugural address as CEO, she warned of the UK's need to "be clear-eyed about Chinese ambition in technological advancement", citing China's "hostile activity in cyberspace".

In June 2021 she spoke at the Royal United Services Institute. Cameron said that ransomware attacks were the major threat to United Kingdom cyber security. She noted that it is possible to obtain ransomware as a service (RaaS) for either a flat fee or for a share of the profits.

Lindy spoke at the 12th annual Tel Aviv Cyber Week in June 2022, identifying ransomware as the primary cyber threat to global security, which is both pervasive and quickly evolving.

References 

Living people
21st-century British civil servants
Alumni of Balliol College, Oxford
Civil servants from Belfast
Tufts University alumni
Graduates of the Royal College of Defence Studies
Year of birth missing (living people)
Companions of the Order of the Bath
Officers of the Order of the British Empire
20th-century British civil servants
Cybercrime in the United Kingdom